TurboVote is an American non-profit website that seeks to increase voter turnout by helping its users register to vote, find polling places, and research election issues. Its parent company, Democracy Works, was co-founded by Kathryn Peters and Seth Flaxman, the current CEO, in 2010.

History 
TurboVote was first piloted at Boston University during the 2010 midterm elections.

TurboVote's parent company, Democracy Works, is a 501(c)(3) non-profit organization. Its donors include the Knight Foundation, which has given US$5.15 million since 2012.

As of 2019, TurboVote has 51 employees and six million voters in its Brooklyn, New York City office.

Services and partnerships 
TurboVote's services include helping voters register to vote and apply for absentee or mail-in ballots and sending text and email reminders about elections. Its services are available in English and Spanish.

TurboVote has partnered with more than three hundred institutions of higher education, non-profit organizations, and companies to register more than ten million voters. Some partners sponsor mailings, allowing TurboVote to send legal paperwork to voters by mail.

Democracy Works' partners have included Google, Snapchat, Twitter, Microsoft, Amazon, reddit, WordPress, Tumblr, BuzzFeed with Barack Obama, Spotify, Starbucks, Airbnb, Target, Uber, Instagram, and Lady Gaga.

Controversies 
TurboVote has been blamed on numerous occasions for incorrectly informing voters about polling station locations.

In 2018, TurboVote texted its users in Boone County, Missouri outdated information based on the polling station locations from four years prior. After the county clerk's office contacted TurboVote, they texted correct information to the affected voters.

In 2018, scammers posed as employees of TurboVote, phoning prospective voters in Georgia and Washington in search of personal information and money.

In 2019, the National Association of Secretaries of State claimed that TurboVote has periodically failed to process voter registrations, like on September 25, 2018, National Voter Registration Day, when their website crashed. The Association wrote to Facebook and Twitter, asking them to terminate their relationships with TurboVote.

References 

Non-profit organizations based in New York City
Companies based in Brooklyn
Voter registration